Gavrilo Avramović was the metropolitan of Dabar-Bosnia (around 1578–88). He was the exarch of the Patriarch of Peć for Dalmatia and was responsible for organizing the Serbian Orthodox Church in the region. Around 1588 he had left Bosnia and Dalmatia, and with the monks of the Rmanj monastery, where he lived, and many people, he moved under the Austrian government in Croatia. Metropolitan Avramović is credited with founding of the first Serbian monasteries in Croatia, Marča and Gomorje.

See also
Eparchy of Dalmatia

References

Sources 
 This article is initially based on the article from the National Encyclopedia Serbian-Croatian-Slovene, Avramović Gavrilo, written by Radoslav Grujić.

Literature 
 Д. Витковић, Дабро-босански митрополит Гаврило Аврамовић (1912).

16th-century Serbian people
Bishops of Dabar-Bosnia
Serbs of Croatia
History of the Serbian Orthodox Church in Croatia
Serbs of Bosnia and Herzegovina
16th-century people from the Ottoman Empire